Bird's invasion of Kentucky was one phase of an extensive planned series of operations planned by the British in 1780 during the American Revolutionary War, whereby the entire West, from Quebec to the Gulf of Mexico, was to be swept clear of both Spanish and American forces. While Bird's campaign met with limited success, raiding two fortified settlements, it failed in its primary objective.  Other British operations that were part of the plan also failed.

Background
British authorities, during the spring of 1780, prepared to carry out a comprehensive plan for the recapture of the Illinois Country and to attack St. Louis, New Orleans, and other Spanish posts on the Mississippi River. Spain, allied with France, had joined the war against Great Britain in 1779, and had rapidly gained control over British positions along the Mississippi in that year.  Four simultaneous movements were planned. Capt. Henry Bird, with a force from Detroit, was directed to "amuse" George Rogers Clark at the Falls of the Ohio. General John Campbell, 5th Duke of Argyll, from Pensacola, after taking New Orleans was to proceed up the Mississippi to Natchez where he was to be joined by a third force that descended the Illinois River and captured St. Louis. Capt. Charles de Langlade was to lead the force down the Illinois, which was to split up and also monitor Vincennes.

No part of the plan proved successful.  Campbell was preoccupied with the threat posed by Bernardo de Gálvez, the governor of Spanish Louisiana, who captured Mobile in March 1780 (and then also captured Pensacola in 1781).  The expedition against St. Louis was repulsed.  Langlade withdrew his remaining forces when Illinois cavalry approached.

Invasion
From Fort Detroit, Captain Henry Bird of the 8th Regiment of Foot led an Indian force of 1,000 men, accompanied by a 150 soldiers and militiamen (Regulars of the 8th and 47th Regiments, Detroit Militia and bombardiers of the Royal Regiment of Artillery), against the settlers of Kentucky in June 1780.  When they reached the confluence of the Miami and Ohio Rivers, his large Indian contingent, concerned that Clark, a formidable presence in their view, was at the falls, insisted on attacking smaller forts and stations instead.  While they might have successfully reached the falls while Clark was absent (he was coordinating defenses on the Mississippi with the Spanish), Bird was unable to convince them to maintain the original plan.

Working its way without opposition along the Licking River, the vanguard of Bird's force reached Ruddle's Station, surrounding it on the night of June 21.  Bird himself arrived the next day with the main body of his force, and cannon fire quickly breached the wooden walls of the station.  Isaac Ruddle insisted on having the people under his protection treated as British captives, under the protection of the small British contingent.  The Indians ignored this, and rushed into the fort to plunder and pillage.  According to Bird "they rushed in, tore the poor children from their mothers' breasts, killed and wounded many."  After the Indians had divided the prisoners and loot to their satisfaction, they wanted to continue on to the next station.  Bird successfully got them to agree that prisoners taken in the future would be turned over to them at British discretion.

Martin's Station, not far from Ruddle's was similarly surprised, and surrendered. The settlers at Martin's Station could hear the gunfire at Ruddell's Fort and were not surprised when the British appeared. They stayed with the walls of the station as their best protection, though they were compelled to surrender. The Indians honored the bargain with Bird, and the prisoners were given over to the British soldiers.  A war party of approximately sixty men split off from the larger campaign in order to attack Grant’s Station (approximately 5 miles northeast of Bryan's). Although forty men were dispatched from Bryan’s Station to provide relief, Grant’s was burned, and two men and a woman were killed.

While the Indians next wanted to attack Lexington, the largest settlement in the area, Bird ordered the expedition to end, citing depletion of provisions and reduced waterflow on the Licking River for the transport of the field cannons.

The expedition then retraced its steps.  After crossing the Ohio, Indians who lived in the area (Delaware, Shawnee, and Miami) began leaving the expedition, taking their booty and prisoners with them.  When Bird reached Fort Detroit on August 4, the force still held 300 prisoners taken from the two stations, including many slaves who were separated from their owners and kept as spoils of war by the raid's commanders.

Aftermath
The fear Bird's campaign instilled led many settlers to abandon their lands and flee to the east.  Clark, who wanted instead to recruit settlers for campaigns against the Indian settlements north of the Ohio that were home to some of the expedition's participants, closed the only road out of Kentucky to the east in order to gain additional recruits and weapons.

See also
 List of battles fought in Kentucky
 American Revolutionary War § Stalemate in the North. Places ' Siege of Fort Vincennes ' in overall sequence and strategic context.

References

Sources
 Adams, James Truslow. Dictionary of American History. New York: Charles Scribner's Sons, 1940
 Harrison, Lowell. A new history of Kentucky
 Banta, R. E. The Ohio

 Mahan, Russell, "The Kentucky Kidnappings and Death March: The Revolutionary War at Ruddell's Fort and Martin's Station," West Haven Utah: Historical Enterprises, 2020.

External links
"Ruddles & Martins Station Historical Association", 
J. Winston Coleman, Jr., "The British Invasion of Kentucky," 1951.
"The King's, or 8th Regiment – Detroit Garrison" , reenactment group

Campaigns of the American Revolutionary War
Battles in the Western theater of the American Revolutionary War
Conflicts in 1780
B
Battles of the American Revolutionary War in Kentucky